The Pianist is a 2002 French-German-British historical film directed by Roman Polanski. It is based on the autobiographical novel The Pianist written by Władysław Szpilman.

Awards and nominations

References

External links
 

Lists of accolades by film
Roman Polanski